Australia has over 1,700 species of native bee. Bees collect pollen from flowers to feed their young. Flies do not do this, although they may be seen eating pollen, so identification is not always easy.

Sting or no sting, solitary vs social 
Eleven of the species, the social native bees, are in two genera, Tetragonula and Austroplebeia, and have no sting.

Of the remainder, which live solitary lives, none are aggressive, and most cannot actually use their sting on humans because they are too small to do so. Larger examples of Australian native bee are capable of stinging if handled or squashed.

The stings of most Australian native species of bee will cause relatively minor discomfort to most people -- "not as painful as those of a bull ant or paper wasp and last only a few minutes". However, they may sting more than once, and can cause an allergic reaction—increasing effect associated with repeated exposure to the antigen.

Honey 
None of the native species of bee in Australia are true honey bees, which are native to Europe, Asia and Africa. Social species of native bees do produce honey, but not much, as they are relatively primitive bee species. In cool-climate areas of Australia, all the honey the bees produce is needed by the swarm to live through winter. 

Collecting honey from Australian native bee nests can cause many of the bees to drown in spilt honey. The honey is tangy in comparison with commercial honey taken from the European honey bee. The bees store their honey in "small resinous pots which look like bunches of grapes".

Pollination 
The different species of Australian native bee have different habits and preferences in gathering pollen, so different species are better pollinators of a given plant than other species. Research is currently underway into use of Amegilla ("blue-banded bees") for use in pollinating hydroponic tomatoes, while some hydroponic growers are petitioning for introduction to the Australian mainland of the European bumblebee, Bombus terrestris—the island continent Australia has a history of sensationally poor outcomes from introduced species, the most famous example being that of the cane toad Bufo marinus—so the question of use of native vs introduced bees for pollination in Australia is controversial.

Western Australian native bees 
Approximately 800 species of native bee occur in Western Australia, and many of them are endemic. Like all bees, native Australian bees are a type of specialised wasp that has evolved to vegetarianism. They feed on nectar, but it is the female native Australian bee that will thicken the nectar to make honey before taking it back to the nest. Australian bees are mostly solitary insects. A female bee will build a nest with the aid of "workers". Native Australian bees face many threats, particularly from parasitic insects such as some wasps, flies and beetles.

Species 

 Amegilla asserta (Cockerell, 1926)
 Amegilla bombiformis (Teddy bear bee, Golden haired mortar bee) (Smith, 1854)
 Amegilla cingulata (Blue-banded bee) (Fabricius, 1775)
 Amegilla dawsoni (Dawson's burrowing bee) (Rayment, 1951)

Carpenter bees 

 Xylocopa aerata (Golden-green carpenter bee, Green carpenter bee) (Smith, 1851)
 Xylocopa bombylans (Peacock carpenter bee) (Fabricius, 1775)

Reed bees 
Genus Exoneura:
 Exoneura abstrusa (Cockerell, 1922)
 Exoneura albolineata (Cockerell, 1929)
 Exoneura albopilosa (Rayment, 1951)
 Exoneura robusta

Stingless bees 

 Austroplebeia australis (Friese, 1898)
 Austroplebeia cassiae (Cockerell, 1910)
 Austroplebeia cincta (Mocsáry, 1898)
 Austroplebeia essingtoni (Cockerell, 1905)
 Austroplebeia magna (Dollin, Dollin, & Rasmussen, 2015)
 Tetragonula carbonaria (Sugarbag bee)  (Smith, 1854)
 Tetragonula hockingsi (Cockerell, 1929)
 Tetragonula mellipes (Friese, 1898)

See also
 Elizabeth Exley, an Australian native bee entomologist
 Kit Prendergast, an Australian wild bee ecologist

References

External links
 Australian bees list

Bees
Hymenoptera of Australia